Fedovo is a rural locality (a selo) and the administrative center of Fedovskoye Rural Settlement of Plesetsky District, Arkhangelsk Oblast, Russia. The population was 464 as of 2010. There are 10 streets.

Geography 
Fedovo is located on the Mosha River, 46 km southwest of Plesetsk (the district's administrative centre) by road. Sandrovo is the nearest rural locality.

References 

Rural localities in Plesetsky District